Banyuls-dels-Aspres is a commune in the Pyrénées-Orientales department in southern France.

Geography

Localisation 
Banyuls-dels-Aspres is located in the canton of Les Aspres and in the arrondissement of Céret.

History

Government and politics

Mayors

Population
The inhabitants are called Banyulencs.

Sites of interest 

 Saint-Andrew church, first mentioned in 1091 but rebuilt in the 15th century.

Notable people 
 Henri Ey (1900-1977) : psychiatrist and philosopher born in Banyuls-dels-Aspres.

See also
Communes of the Pyrénées-Orientales department

References

Communes of Pyrénées-Orientales